Skyservice Investments (SI) is, according to one investment firm, "Canada’s largest operator and provider of business aviation services. With locations at the Toronto, Montreal, Ottawa and Calgary airports, the company provides fixed base operations and managed aircraft services to corporate and private clients."

According to another service, SI "operates as an aviation company. The Company offers personal and commercial charter aviation, aircraft management and maintenance, air ambulance, [airline] catering, flight planning, courtesy transportation, and other related services. Skyservice Investments serves customers in Canada."

The company is headquartered out of Toronto, Ontario (www.skyservice.com.)

History
SI's own website claims that it was founded in 1986.

Between December 2012 and September 2017, a significant tranche of SI stock was owned by Fulcrum Capital Partners.

InstarAGF Essential Infrastructure Fund purchased the majority stake of Skyservice Investments in September 2017 from Fulcrum. In the same month Skyservice Investments Inc. - Les Investissements Skyservice Inc. was discontinued on the Federal Corporate registry.
 
Skyservice has been since 2016 the sole representative of the HondaJet in the Canadian market.

As of June 2018, SKYSERVICE BUSINESS AVIATION INC. aka SKYSERVICE AVIATION D'AFFAIRES INC. was listed as "discontuance pending" in the federal Corporate Registry.

In September 2019, Skyservice sold its sixth HondaJet.

In October 2019, SI purchased an aircraft hangar at Muskoka Airport in Gravenhurst.

Leadership

One of the SI board members is Robert J. Ritchie, who is a former CEO of Canadian Pacific Railway.

Subsidiaries
Skyservice Business Aviation

As of February 2023, Skyservice Business Aviation has the following 58 aircraft registered with Transport Canada and operate as ICAO airline designator STB, and telephony SKYBIZ.

References

Fixed-base operators
Aircraft ground handling companies